Adolf Freiherr von Pfretzschner (August 15, 1820 – April 27, 1901) was a Bavarian politician.

Pfretzschner studied law in Munich and was subsequently employed at the administrations of Upper Bavaria and Middle Franconia. In 1849, he joined the Bavarian ministry of Finance. In 1865, he was appointed Bavarian Minister of State for Commerce and Public Works, in 1866 in addition also for Finance. In 1872 followed his appointment for Minister of State of the Royal House and Foreign Affairs and President of the Council of Ministers by King Ludwig II. In 1873, he was created a lifelong member of the Upper House of the Bavarian parliament. In 1880, Bismarck enforced Pfretzschner's resignation as Pfretzschner was seen as a modest liberal. The day following his resignation, he was elevated to barons' rank.

See also 
 History of Bavaria
 List of Minister-Presidents of Bavaria

References 
 Karl Pfretzschner: Pfretschner. Ahnen prominenter Bayern. VIII. Die Pfretzschner-Ahnen d. Bayer. Ministerratsvors. A. Frhr. v. Pfretzschner. In: Blätter des Bayerischen Landesvereins für Familienkunde. 52/1989, Laßleben, Kallmünz, pp 84–89, ISSN 0005-7118

1820 births
1901 deaths
Barons of Germany
Ministers-President of Bavaria
Members of the Bavarian Reichsrat
Politicians from Würzburg
People from the Kingdom of Bavaria